This article lists political parties in Germany.

The Federal Republic of Germany has a plural multi party system. The largest by members and parliament seats are the Christian Democratic Union (CDU), with its sister party, the Christian Social Union (CSU) and Social Democratic Party of Germany (SPD).

Germany also has a number of other parties, in recent history most importantly the Free Democratic Party (FDP), Alliance 90/The Greens, The Left, and more recently the Alternative for Germany (AfD), founded in 2013. The federal government of Germany often consisted of a coalition of a major and a minor party, specifically CDU/CSU and FDP or SPD and FDP, and from 1998 to 2005 SPD and Greens. From 1966 to 1969, from 2005 to 2009 and from 2013 to 2021, the federal government consisted of a coalition of the two major parties, called Grand Coalition.
Coalitions in the Bundestag and state legislatures are often described by party colors. Party colors are red for the Social Democratic Party, green for Alliance 90/The Greens, yellow for the Free Democratic Party, purple (officially red, which is customarily used for the SPD) for the Left, light blue for the AfD, and black and blue for the CDU and CSU respectively.

Current parties

Parties represented in the Bundestag and/or the European Parliament

Other parties represented in state parliaments

Minor parties

Historical parties

Defunct parties in the Federal Republic of Germany

Defunct parties in Allied-occupied Germany

Parties in East Germany

During transition (1989–90)

Parties in the Saar Protectorate

Parties in Weimar Republic

Parties founded before World War I

See also
 Lists of political parties; categories by country and ideology.
 History of Germany since 1945
 Liberalism in Germany

References

External links 
 Political Parties (Germany) - List of German political parties since 1949
 Overview of the elections since 1946 (Übersicht der Wahlen seit 1946) (on the website of the Tagesschau news service) - Election results in Germany since 1946 on state, federal and European levels (German descriptions, but graphics and data can be accessed without these).

Germany
Political parties
 
Germany
Political parties